is a city located in Yamagata Prefecture, Japan. ,  the city had an estimated population of 31,112 in 11379 households, and a population density of 190 persons per km².

Geography
Nan'yo is located in the northern part of Okitama Basin in southern Yamagata Prefecture, with mountains to the north, east and west and the Mogami River forming its southern border. It is approximately 21 km from Yonezawa, 35 km from Yamagata city, 61 km from Fukushima, and 95 km from Sendai. The city has an altitude of about 200 meters in the plains rising to 450 meters in the northern mountains. Mt. Shirataka (elevation 994 meters) is the highest elevation in the city.

Neighboring municipalities
Yamagata Prefecture
Yamagata
Nagai
Kaminoyama
Takahata
Kawanishi
Shirataka
Yamanobe

Climate
Nan'yō has a Humid continental climate (Köppen climate classification Cfa) with large seasonal temperature differences, with warm to hot (and often humid) summers and cold (sometimes severely cold) winters. Precipitation is significant throughout the year, but is heaviest from August to October. The average annual temperature in Nan'yō is 11.3 °C. The average annual rainfall is 1486 mm with September as the wettest month. The temperatures are highest on average in August, at around 25.0 °C, and lowest in January, at around -1.4 °C.

Demographics
Per Japanese census data, the population of Nan'yō has declined slightly over the past 30 years.

History
The area of present-day Nan'yo was part of ancient Dewa Province. In Japanese folklore it is the setting of the Tsuru no Ongaeshi legend. After the start of the Meiji period, the area was organized into villages within Higashiokitama District, Yamagata Prefecture with the establishment of the modern municipalities system, including the village of Akayu. Akayu was raised to town status in December 1895.

The city of Nan'yo was established on April 1, 1967 by the merger of the former towns of Miyauchi and Akayu with the village of Wagō. Akayu is famous for its hot springs, cherries and hang gliding and includes the former village of Nakagawa. Miyauchi is famous for its chrysanthemum festival and the Kumano-taisha Shrine, and includes the former villages of Urushiyama, Yoshino, and Kaneyama. The village of Wago was created in 1955 by the merger of the villages of Okigō and Ringō.  The English travel-writer Isabella Bird visited Akayu in 1878 and wrote about the town in Unbeaten Tracks in Japan. The city is named after Nanyang, China, where according to legend a  chrysanthemum spring can make drinkers immortal.

Government
Nan'yō has a mayor-council form of government with a directly elected mayor and a unicameral city legislature of 1７ members. The city contributes one member to the Yamagata Prefectural Assembly.  In terms of national politics, the city is part of Yamagata District 2 of the lower house of the Diet of Japan.

Economy
The economy of Nan'yo is based on agriculture, light manufacturing, and tourism.  A number of wineries are also located in the city.

Wine

Nan'yō is home to the following three major wineries.
 Sakai Winery 
 Oura Winery 
 Sato Winery

In addition to the three wineries, Nan'yō is also home to a sake brewery called .

Education
Nan'yō has seven public elementary schools and three public middle schools operated by the city government and one public high school operated by the Yamagata Prefectural Board of Education.

High schools
 Nan'yō High School

Junior high schools
 Akayu Junior High School
 Miyauchi Junior High School
 Okigō Junior High School

Elementary schools
 Akayu Elementary School
 Miyauchi Elementary School
 Nakagawa Elementary School
 Ogi Elementary School
 Okigō Elementary School
 Ringō Elementary School
 Urushiyama Elementary School

Transportation

Railway
 East Japan Railway Company -Yamagata Shinkansen
 
 East Japan Railway Company - Ōu Main Line
 ,  
 Yamagata Railway Company - Flower Nagai Line

Highways

Media

Newspapers
 Okitama Times

Local attractions

 Inarimori Kofun, Akayu
 Akayu Onsen, Akayu
 Nan'yo Skypark, Akayu
 Mount Eboshi, Akayu. Listed as one of the 100 cherry blossoms sights in Japan.
 Toyotarō Yūki Memorial Museum, Akayu
 Kumano Shrine, Miyauchi
 Hygeia Park onsen complex, Miyauchi
 The 33 Images of Buddha, Mt Iwabu, Nakagawa
 Yuzuru no Sato Museum, Urushiyama
 Chinzo-ji Temple, Urushiyama
 Kuguri waterfall, Kotaki
 Lake Hakuryuu, Akayu

Local events

 Eboshiyama park cherry blossom festival, Akayu, late April to early May
 Sosho park rose festival, Miyauchi, June
 Kumano-taisha festival, Miyauchi, 24–25 July
 Grape picking, sightseeing vineyard, Akayu, August–October
 Nan'yō wine festival, Hygeia park, Miyauchi, August
 Akayu onsen furosato festival, Akayu, second weekend of September
 Chrysanthemum doll festival, Miyauchi, mid-October to mid-November

Twin towns and sister cities

 Nanyang, Henan, China,  since October 6, 1988

Notable people from Nan'yo 

Kyoko Inoue, professional wrestler
Megumi Ikeda, fencer
Toyotarō Yūki, banker, politician

References

External links 

Official Website 

 
Cities in Yamagata Prefecture